The highways in Slovenia are the central state roads in Slovenia and are divided into motorways (AC) and expressways (HC). They have white-on-green road signs as in Italy, Croatia and other countries nearby. Expressways are secondary roads, also dual carriageways, usually without a hard shoulder.

Highways and accessory structures in Slovenia are managed by the state-owned Motorway Company in the Republic of Slovenia (acronym DARS) established in 1994. , DARS is managing and maintaining 625 kilometres of motorways and expressways, 143 kilometres of ramps, 22 kilometres of junctions, 27 kilometres of rest areas and 41 kilometres of other roads. Since 1 June 2008, highway users in Slovenia are required to buy a vignette: 7-day, 1-month and annual passes are available.

Motorways

Expressways

History 

The first highway in Slovenia was opened in 1972, connecting Vrhnika and Postojna. Constructed under the reformist minded Communist government of Stane Kavčič, their development plan envisioned a modern highway network spanning Slovenia and connecting the republic to Italy and Austria. After the reformist fraction of the Communist Party of Slovenia was deposed in the early 1970s, the expansion of the Slovenian highway network came to a halt.

In 1994, the new country started a National Motorway Construction Programme (NPIA), effectively re-using the old Communist plans. Since then, 528 km of motorways, expressways and similar roads have been completed, easing automotive transport across the country and providing a much better road service between eastern and western Europe. This has encouraged the development of transportation and export industries.

According to the Slovenian Motorway Company Act valid since December 2010, the construction and building of highways in Slovenia is carried out and financed by private companies, primarily the Motorway Company in the Republic of Slovenia (planned to become at least partially private), while the strategic planning and the acquisition of land for their course is carried out and financed by the state. The highways are owned by DARS.

The apparent slower tempo of construction of Slovenian highways in the direction north–south, in comparison to the direction east–west, has been the source of some speculation in Croatian media, because Croatia had built many highways northwards (toward Slovenia), yet the other side has not yet followed suit, thereby impacting the connections of Croatia with western Europe through Slovenia.
This is despite some agreements on the official government level.
In particular this refers to the roads between Trieste/Koper and Istria/Rijeka, the route Ljubljana-Zagreb, as well as Maribor-Zagreb.
The officials from the Slovenian Ministry of Transportation have rejected claims that their road construction is lagging behind Croatia, saying that they are an exaggeration, as their overall kilometers of highway per person ratio and other statistics are favorable. In 2009, the first of the four planned highway connections was completed, the A2 Ljubljana-Obrežje towards Zagreb. A second one, A4 Maribor-Gruškovje towards Zagreb, was completed in 2018. , construction of the Slovenian sections of both the future Pula-Koper and Rijeka-Postojna motorways is on hold, despite connecting sections on the Croatian side having long been completed.

See also
 Driving in Slovenia
 Transport in Slovenia
 List of controlled-access highway systems
 Evolution of motorway construction in European nations

References

External links

 DARS Homepage
 Latest map link – DARS
 Exit lists and descriptions of Slovenian highways